The list of World War II ships of less than 1000-tons is an alphabetical list of minor military ships and ship classes of World War II.  Only ships with a displacement of less than 1000 tons are listed.  For larger vessels, see list of World War II ships. For other ship classes, see the list of World War II ship classes.

Ship classes of World War II (1,000 tons or less)

Ships of World War II of 1,000 tons or less 

 Ahti (Estonia): 140-ton gunboat
 Ajonpää (Finland): 52-ton Ajonpää class minesweeper
 Amiral Murgescu (Romania): 812-ton minelayer
 Aura (Finland): 400-ton coast guard and escort vessel
 Aura II (Finland): 563-ton presidential yacht and escort vessel
 Aurora (Romania): 314-ton minelayer

 Baire (Cuba): 500-ton gunboat
 Barranquilla (Colombia): 142-ton gunboat
 Bathurst Class (Argentina): 500-ton minesweeper
 Belomorec (Bulgaria): 77-ton patrol boat
 Beskytteren (Denmark): 415-ton fisheries patrol vessel
 Birago (Germany): 50-ton patrol boat, ex-Siofok (Austria)
 Bogota (Colombia): 360-ton gunboat
 Bouchard class (Argentina): 450-ton minesweeper
  (Norway): 107-ton torpedo boat

 Capitan Quevedo (Cuba): 115-ton coast guard craft
 Carabobo (Colombia): 120-ton coast guard vessel
 Carioca (Brazil): 552-ton mine layer
 Cartagena (Colombia): 142-ton gunboat
 Chiang Kung (China): 250-ton patrol boat
 Chiang Tai (China): 250-ton patrol boat
 Chen Shen (China): 275-ton river gunboat
 Chernomorec (Bulgaria): 77-ton patrol boat
 Chi Jih (China): 500-ton survey vessel
 Chien Chung (China): 90-ton river gunboat
 Chien Kang (China): 390-ton destroyer, became Yamasemi (Japan)
 Chu Chien (China): 740-ton gunboat
 Chu Kuan (China): 740-ton gunboat
 Chu Tai (China): 740-ton gunboat
 Chu Tung (China): 740-ton gunboat
 Chu Yiu (China): 740-ton gunboat
 Chu Yu (China): 740-ton gunboat
 Chung Shan (China): 780-ton gunboat, ex-Yung Feng
 Cordoba (Argentina): 890-ton destroyer
 Cordoba (Colombia): 360-ton gunboat
 Czajka (Poland) 183-ton minesweeper 
 Czapla (Poland) 183-ton minesweeper

 Delfinul (Romania): 650-ton submarine
 Diez de Octubre (Cuba): 218-ton gunboat
 Dragen (Denmark): 290-ton torpedo boat, became TFA3 (Germany)
 Drazki (Bulgaria): 97-ton torpedo boat and minesweeper, commissioned 5 Jan 1908, today museum ship
 Durres (Albania): 46-ton patrol boat

 El Fateh (Egypt): 128-ton river gunboat
 El Zahir (Egypt): 128-ton river gunboat
 Elicura (Chile): 400-ton coast guard vessel

 Fei Ying (China): 850-ton destroyer
 Freja (Denmark): 322-ton patrol boat, became Sudpol (Germany), then Freya (Germany)
 Fresia (Chile): 435-ton submarine
 Frøya (Norway): 870-ton minelayer
 Fu Yu (China): 630-ton gunboat

 General Haller (Poland): 342-ton gunboat
 Glenten (Denmark): 290-ton torpedo boat
 Glommen (Norway): 351-ton minelayer
 Guacolda (Chile): 435-ton submarine
 Guale (Chile): 435-ton submarine

 Hafir (Egypt): 74-ton river gunboat
 Hai Fu (China): 166-ton gunboat
 Hai Ho (China): 211-ton river gunboat
 Hai Hung (China): 190-ton gunboat
 Hai Ku (China): 190-ton gunboat
 Hai Ou (China): 166-ton patrol boat
 Hai Peng (China): 211-ton river gunboat
 Hai Yen (China): 56-ton patrol boat
 Hämeenmaa (Finland): 400-ton training sloop
 Havkatten (Denmark): 108-ton torpedo boat
 Havørnen (Denmark): 108-ton torpedo boat and minesweeper
 Heimdal (Norway): 578-ton offshore patrol vessel
 Hejmdal (Denmark): 705-ton patrol boat, became Nerger (Germany)
 Henrik Gerner (Denmark): 463-ton submarine tender and minelayer
 Henrique Diaz (Brazil): 680-ton trawler
 Hitra (Norway): 125-ton submarine chaser
 Høgen (Denmark): 290-ton torpedo boat, became TFA1 (Germany)
 Hoi Fu (China): 680-ton gunboat
 Honningsvåg (Norway): 487-ton naval trawler
 Hsien Ning (China): 418-ton gunboat
 Hu Ngo (China): 97-ton torpedo boat, became Kawasemi (Japan)
 Hu Peng (China): 97-ton torpedo boat
 Hu Tsuin (China): 97-ton torpedo boat
 Hu Ying (China): 97-ton torpedo boat
 Hvalen (Denmark): 290-ton torpedo boat, became TFA5 (Germany)
 Hvalrossen (Denmark): 160-ton torpedo boat

 Iguape (Brazil): 150-ton minesweeper
 Iku-Turso (Finland): 716-ton submarine
 Ilmatar (Estonia): gunboat
 Islands Falk (Denmark): 760-ton fishery patrol vessel
 Itacuruca (Brazil): 210-ton mine layer
 Itajahy (Brazil): 150-ton minesweeper
 Itapemirim (Brazil): 340-ton mine layer

 Jaskółka (Poland): 183-ton minesweeper
 Jen Shen (China): 300-ton gunboat
 Junín (Colombia): 120-ton coast guard vessel
 Jurmo (Finland): 400-ton tug

 Kalanpää (Finland): 52-ton Ajonpää class minesweeper
 Kalev (Estonia): 834-ton submarine
 Karjala (Finland): 342-ton gunboat
 Khrabry (Bulgaria): 97-ton minesweeper
 Kiang Chen (China): 550-ton gunboat
 Kiang Heng (China): 550-ton gunboat
 Kiang Hsi (China): 140-ton gunboat
 Kiang Kun (China): 140-ton gunboat
 Kiang Li (China): 550-ton gunboat
 Kiang Yuan (China): 550-ton gunboat
 King (Argentina): 900-ton gunboat 
 Kjell (Norway): 84-ton 2nd class torpedo boat
 King Haakon VII (Norway): 357-ton PC class escort ship
 Komendant Piłsudski (Poland) 342-ton gunboat
 Kung Chen (China): 90-ton river gunboat
 Kvintus (Denmark): 186-ton minelayer, became Fürstenburg (Germany)

 La Plata (Argentina): 890-ton destroyer
 Laaland (Denmark): 350-ton minelayer
 Laine (Estonia): 211-ton gunboat
 Laxen (Denmark): 290-ton torpedo boat, became TFA6 (Germany)
 Lech (Poland) 280-ton Tugboat
 Lembit (Estonia): 834-ton submarine
 Leopard, former HNoMS Balder (Norway, then Germany): 708-ton torpedo boat, returned to Norway 1949, scrapped 1961
 Li Chieh (China): 266-ton gunboat, became Lisui (Japan)
 Lieska (Finland): 60-ton minelayer
 Lindormen (Denmark): 614-ton minelayer, became Vs1401 (Germany)
 Loimu (Finland): 60-ton minelayer
 Lossen (Denmark): 628-ton minelayer
 Lougen (Denmark): 350-ton minelayer
 Louhi (Finland): 640-ton minelayer and submarine tender

 Maagen (Denmark): 110-ton fishery patrol vessel
 Makrelen (Denmark): 108-ton torpedo boat
 Maranho (Brazil): 934-ton destroyer
 Mardus (Estonia): 80-ton gunboat
 Mariscal Sucre (Colombia): 125-ton gunboat
 Marsuinul (Romania): 636-ton submarine 
 Mato Grosso (Brazil): 560-ton destroyer
 Mazur (Poland) 340-ton torpedo boat
 Mewa (Poland): 183-ton minesweeper 
 Miina (Finland): 80-ton mine tender
 Ming Chuen (China): 465-ton gunboat
 Ming Sen (China): 465-ton gunboat, captured by Japan 
  MTB 102 (UK) 68-foot Motor Torpedo Boat 
  MTB 345 (UK, then Norway) 16.05-ton Motor Torpedo Boat
 Murature (Argentina): 900-ton gunboat

 Najaden (Denmark): 782-ton torpedo boat, completed 1947
 Năluca (Romania): 266-ton torpedo boat
 Narhvalen (Denmark): 108-ton torpedo boat and minesweeper
 Narvi (Finland): 400-ton tug
 SS Nautilus (India): 300 ton gun boat and coast guard
 Nordkaperen (Denmark): 108-ton torpedo boat
 Nordkapp (Norway): 275-ton fishery protection vessel
 Nymphen (Denmark): 782-ton torpedo boat, completed 1947

 Ørnen (Denmark): 290-ton torpedo boat, became TFA2 (Germany)
 Otra (Norway): 355-ton minesweeper

 Panay (USA): 474-ton river gunboat, sunk 12 December 1937
 Paraguacu (Brazil): 430-ton river monitor
 Parnaiba (Brazil): 620-ton river monitor
 Paukku (Finland): 60-ton minelayer
 Pernambuco (Brazil): 470-ton river monitor
 Pichincha (Colombia): 120-ton coast guard vessel, class of 3
 Pikker (Estonia): 500-ton gunboat, became Kiev (USSR) and later Luga (USSR)
 Pol III (Norway): 214-ton guard vessel
 Pommi (Finland): 80-ton mine tender
 Porkala (Finland): 162-ton minesweeper
 Prezidentas Smetona (Lithuania): 526-ton gunboat, became Pirmūnas and later Korall (USSR) and T-33 (USSR)
 Pukkio (Finland): 162-ton minesweeper

 Quidora (Chile): 435-ton submarine

 Rauma (Norway): 355-ton minesweeper
 Rautu (Finland): 165-ton minesweeper
 Rechinul (Romania): 585-ton submarine
 Reiher (Germany): 109-ton training vessel, ex-West Diep (Belgium), became Warendorp
 Riilahti (Finland): 310-ton minelayer and antisubmarine escort
 Rio Pardo (Brazil): 132-ton submarine chaser
 Ristna (Estonia): 500-ton sidewheeler minelayer
 Rucamilla (Chile): 435-ton submarine
 Ruotsinsalmi (Finland): 310-ton minelayer and antisubmarine escort
 Rybitwa (Poland): 183-ton minesweeper 
 Ryś (Poland): 980-ton submarine

 Sæl (Norway): 107-ton 1. class torpedo boat
 Sælen (Denmark): 108-ton torpedo boat
 Salta (Argentina): 920-ton submarine
 Santa Fe (Argentina): 920-ton submarine
 Santa Marta (Colombia): 142-ton gunboat
 Santiago del Estero (Argentina): 920-ton submarine
 Saranda (Albania): 46-ton patrol boat
 Saukko (Finland): 142-ton submarine
 Sborul (Romania): 262-ton torpedo boat
 Shu Shen (China): 380-ton gunboat
 Siofuk (Austria): 50-ton patrol boat, became the Birago (Germany)
 Sixtus (Denmark): 186-ton minelayer
 Smely (Bulgaria): 97-ton torpedo boat and minesweeper
 Smeul (Romania): 266-ton torpedo boat
 Smok (Poland): 711-ton tugboat
 Søhunden (Denmark): 108-ton torpedo boat and minesweeper
 Søridderen (Denmark): 108-ton torpedo boat and minesweeper, became Hajen (Germany)
 Springeren (Denmark): 108-ton torpedo boat and minesweeper
 Støren (Denmark): 108-ton torpedo boat and minesweeper
  (Norway): 107-ton torpedo boat
 Strogi (Bulgaria): 97-ton torpedo boat and minesweeper
 Sublocotenent Ghiculescu (Romania): 344-ton ASW gunboat
 Sulev (Estonia): 228-ton torpedo boat, became Ametist (USSR)
 Suurop (Estonia): 500-ton sidewheeler minelayer and minesweeper

 Ta Tung (China): 900-ton patrol boat
 Taara (Estonia): gunboat
 Tamoio (Brazil): 844-ton submarine, ex-Ascianghi (Italy)
 Tartu (Estonia): 108-ton gunboat
 Tegualda (Chile): 435-ton submarine
 Teh Sheng (China): 932-ton gunboat, scuttled 1937
 Ternen (Denmark): 100-ton surveying tender and patrol boat
 Timbira (Brazil): 844-ton submarine, ex-Gondor (Italy)
 Tirane (Albania): 46-ton patrol boat
  (Norway): 406-ton patrol boat
 Tse Chiang (China): 900-ton patrol boat 
 Tung An (China): 390-ton destroyer
 Tupi (Brazil): 844-ton submarine, ex-Italian submarine Neghelli
 Tursas (Finland): 360-ton trawler
 Turunmaa (Finland): 342-ton gunboat
 Uisko (Finland): 360-ton trawler
 Uruguay (Argentina): 550-ton sloop
 Uku (Estonia): Gunboat
 Uusimaa (Finland): 400-ton gunboat

 Veinti y Cuatro de Febrero (Cuba): 218-ton gunboat
 Vesihiisi (Finland): 716-ton submarine
 Vesikko (Finland): 300-ton submarine
 Vetehinen (Finland): 716-ton submarine
 Vidar (Norway): 260-ton minelayer
 Vilppula (Finland):  165-ton minesweeper
 Viraitis (Latvia): 586-ton gunboat and minesweeper, became T-297 (USSR)
 Vlorë (Albania): 46-ton patrol boat

 Wakakura (New Zealand): 540-ton Castle class naval trawler 
 Warendorp (Germany): 109-ton training vessel, ex-Reiher
 Wei Sheng (China): 932-ton gunboat, scuttled in 1937
 West Diep (Belgium): 109-ton torpedo boat, became Reiher (Germany)
 Wielingen (Belgium): 227-ton torpedo boat
 Wilk (Poland) 980-ton submarine
 Wu Feng (China): 200-ton gunboat

 Yi Shen (China): 350-ton gunboat
 YP-19 (USA), 37.5-ton patrol vessel
 Yung An (China): 90-ton river gunboat
 Yung Chi (China): 860-ton gunboat, became Hai Hsing (Japan)
 Yung Chien (China): 860-ton gunboat, became Asuka (Japan)
 Yung Feng (China): 780-ton gunboat, became Chung Shan
 Yung Hsiang (China): 780-ton gunboat
 Yung Shen (China): 300-ton gunboat
 Yung Sui (China): 650-ton river gunboat
 Żbik (Poland) 980-ton submarine
 Żuraw (Poland) 183-ton minesweeper

World War II naval ships
Lists of World War II ships